Valerian Kuybyshev class is a class of Russian river passenger ships. It got name after the first ship of class Valerian Kuybyshev.

Four-deck cruise ships manufactured in Komárno, Czechoslovakia, 1976–1983.

River cruise ships of the project 92-016/OL400

Overview

See also
 List of river cruise ships
 Rossiya-class motorship (1952)
 Rossiya-class motorship (1973)
 Dmitriy Furmanov-class motorship
 Baykal-class motorship
 Anton Chekhov-class motorship
 Sergey Yesenin-class motorship
 Oktyabrskaya Revolyutsiya-class motorship
 Ukraina-class motorship
 Dunay-class motorship
 Rodina-class motorship
 Vladimir Ilyich-class motorship
 Maksim Gorkiy-class motorship

References

External links
 Проект 92-016, тип Валериан Куйбышев 

River cruise ships
Ships of Russia
Passenger ships of the Soviet Union
Czechoslovakia–Soviet Union relations